The 1580s BC was a decade lasting from January 1, 1589 BC to December 31, 1580 BC.

Events and trends
The Egyptians invented a new and better calendar. It is based on both the moon and a star. They observed the annual appearance of the brightest star in the sky, Sirius. This calendar was more advanced than the Babylonian calendar.

Significant people
 Erishum III, King of Assyria, 1598–1586 BC (traditional date), or ca. 1580–1567 BC (newer dating)
 Actaeus, King of Athens, first King of Athens according to the Parian Chronicle succeeded in the throne by Cecrops I

References